Buckholts Independent School District is a public school district based in Buckholts, Texas, United States. The district has one school that serves students in  prekindergarten through grade 12.

Academic achievement
In 2009, the school district was rated "academically acceptable" by the Texas Education Agency (TEA). Buckholts ISD's TEA accreditation was revoked in 2018.

Special programs

Athletics
Buckholts High School plays six-man football.

See also

List of school districts in Texas

References

External links

School districts in Milam County, Texas